Edward George Hartnell (13 August 1823 – 28 December 1897) was an English first-class cricketer active 1844–62 who played for Surrey. He was born in Balham, Surrey, educated privately and at Trinity College, Cambridge, and died in Pietermaritzburg. He played in 22 first-class matches.

References

1823 births
1897 deaths
English cricketers
Surrey cricketers
Cambridge University cricketers
Gentlemen of England cricketers
Gentlemen of Kent cricketers
Gentlemen of the South cricketers
Marylebone Cricket Club cricketers
Surrey Club cricketers
Alumni of Trinity College, Cambridge